Barney Smith may refer to:
 Barney Smith (diplomat)
 Barney Smith (artist)